IIIT Basara also known as, Rajiv Gandhi University of Knowledge Technologies (RGUKT) is a state university in Basara, Nirmal district, Telangana, India. The university offers Undergraduate & Post Graduate degrees in various technology programmes.

Campus
IIIT Basara is located in Basara village in Nirmal district, Telangana. It was set up under RGUKT (Rajiv Gandhi University of Knowledge Technologies) Act of 2008 to encourage meritorious students from rural areas to take up courses in technology.

Academics
IIIT Basara offers six-year Bachelor of Technology after 10th class examinations which includes two years pre-university course equivalent to intermediate degree followed by four year degree course in engineering course. It also offers postgraduate Master of Technology courses.

Affiliation
IIIT Basara comes under autonomous Institutions specialized in teaching and research sector in Information Technology and engineering. The institution follows the norms of its own and does not follow regulations of Government of India, University Grants Commission  (UGC) India.

Culture and activities
With education the institute also emphasizes on Extra Academic Activity (EAA) as mandatory part of education. It conducts various extra academic activities such as arts, vocal music, Kuchipudi dance, and Yoga.  The initiative to include classical art forms of India in the curriculum was conceptualised.
AntahPragnya, a national level techno-cultural fest was being conducted every year.

Departments
 Chemical Engineering
 Civil Engineering
 Computer Science and Engineering
 Electrical Engineering
 Electronics and Communication Engineering
 Mechanical Engineering
 Metallurgical and Materials Engineering
 Business Management
 Mathematics
 Physics
 Chemistry

See also
 Indian Institutes of Information Technology
 International Institute of Information Technology, Hyderabad

References

2008 establishments in Andhra Pradesh
Educational institutions established in 2008
Engineering colleges in Telangana
State universities in Telangana